The 1973 Cornell Big Red football team was an American football team that represented Cornell University during the 1973 NCAA Division I football season. Cornell finished sixth in the Ivy League. 

In its eighth season under head coach Jack Musick, the team compiled a 3–5–1 record but outscored opponents 170 to 154. Bob Lally was the team captain. 

Cornell's 2–5 conference record placed sixth in the Ivy League standings. The Big Red outscored Ivy opponents 128 to 126. 

Cornell played its home games at Schoellkopf Field in Ithaca, New York.

Schedule

References

Cornell
Cornell Big Red football seasons
Cornell Big Red football